Micardia pulcherrima is a species of moth of the family Noctuidae. It is found in Bhutan, China (Tibet) and India.

References

Moths described in 1867
Acontiinae
Moths of Asia